Red Cities is Chris Brokaw's debut solo album, following the demise of Come.

Background
Released in 2002 by 12xu and Kimchee Records, the album was recorded by Peter Weiss at Zippah Recording, in Brookline, MA, during January and March 2001. The idea for the album was originally conceived in 1998, the centerpiece of the entire project being "The Fields (Part II)". As Brokaw himself has stated, "[t]he record just came to [him] as a whole" before the demise of his previous band, and Brokaw "didn’t want them to become Come songs — which is what most of [his] songs would have been at the time." After producing the first demos on an 8-track cassette recorder, Brokaw decided to attempt to undertake the project on his own.

"The Look of Love" is a cover of Burt Bacharach's 1967 single.

Track listing

Personnel 
 Chris Brokaw – guitars and percussion

Additional personnel

 Pete Weiss – Producer, Mixing
 Peter Linnane – Assistant Engineer
 Paul Q. Kolderie – Mixing
 David M. Curry – Pre-production
 Andy Hong – Pre-production
 Carl Plaster – Pre-production
 Jeff Lipton – Audio mastering
 Dan Zedek – Cover Design
 Maxi del Campo – Photography
 Milo Jones – Arrangements on "The Look of Love" (with Chris Brokaw)

Critical reception
Time Out New York referred to Red Cities as "an evocative set of instrumentals," and elsewhere, "an enthralling spread of guitar-and-percussion instrumentals that have as much emotional power as -and greater range than- any of his previous outings." Pitchfork's praiseful review of Red Cities''' follow-up Wandering as Water'' referred to both albums as "largely vocal offering[s] creep[ing] along an unadorned path towards anachronistic purity." In his positive review of the album for Hot Press magazine, Colin Carberry stated that "some of the tracks on Red Cities are so vividly redolent of a sense of place, it could almost be the soundtrack for a series of imaginary J.G Ballard travelogues." Likewise, Roman Sokal, writing for Exclaim! magazine, asserts that "[t]here is absolutely no hint of pretension within the album, just a stepped back assault of thoughtful and clever 'soundtrack' music for your aching soul."

References

External links 
 Allmusic Review

Chris Brokaw albums
Post-rock albums by American artists
2002 albums